Expenses scandal may refer to:

Canada
 Senate expenses scandal
 Nova Scotia parliamentary expenses scandal
Saskatchewan expenses scandal

Ireland
 Ivor Callely expenses scandal
 FÁS expenses scandal
 John O'Donoghue expenses scandal

United Kingdom
 United Kingdom parliamentary expenses scandal